The Grenada Renaissance Party is a political party in Grenada. It contested the 2003 general elections, but received only six votes and failed to win a seat. It also ran three candidates in the 2013 general election receiving 20 votes.

Electoral history

House of Representatives elections

References 

Political parties in Grenada
Political parties established in 2003